Viens jouer avec nous is a German television series.

See also
List of German television series

French-language education television programming
1983 German television series debuts
1983 German television series endings
German television shows featuring puppetry
Das Erste original programming